The diving competitions at the 2020 Summer Olympics in Tokyo featured eight events . It was one of four aquatic sports at the Games, along with swimming, water polo, and synchronised swimming.

The events were men's and women's versions each of: 3m springboard, synchronised 3m springboard, 10m platform, and synchronised 10m platform.

The diving competitions featured up to 136 athletes. All divers had to be at least 14 years old on or by 31 December 2020.

For the ninth consecutive Games, China dominated the medal table, and for the fifth occasion in that period were denied a clean sweep of diving golds by a single event; in this case, the 10 metre synchronised men's event won by Great Britain's Tom Daley and Matty Lee. This was the second consecutive Games that Great Britain denied China the sweep, after Jack Laugher and Chris Mears denied them in 2016. The United States took third in the medal table, completing a repeat of the top 3 nations from Rio.

Qualification

A nation can have no more than 16 divers qualify (up to eight males and eight females) and can enter up to two divers in individual events and one pair in synchronized events.

For the individual diving events, qualifiers will be:
the top 12 finishers in each event from the 2019 World Championships;
the five continental champions in each event;
the top 18 from the 2020 FINA Diving World Cup; and
additional competitors from the 2020 FINA Diving World Cup until the maximum quota is reached.

For the synchronized events (pairs), qualifiers will be:
the top three finishers in each event from the 2019 World Championships;
the top four in each event at the 2020 World Cup; and
the host nation (Japan).

Note: Qualifying spots will go to the nation; they are not tied to the individual diver who achieved the place/finish at the qualifying event. However, an individual diver might only qualify one spot for their nation.

Participating nations

The following nations have won quota places for the diving competitions. Qualification is as yet incomplete.

Schedule

Medalists

Medal table

Men

Women

See also
Diving at the 2018 Asian Games
Diving at the 2018 Commonwealth Games
Diving at the 2018 Summer Youth Olympics
Diving at the 2019 Pan American Games

References

External links
 Results book
Results book (Archived Link)

 
2020
2020 Summer Olympics events
Diving competitions in Japan
International aquatics competitions hosted by Japan
Olympics